Shazhou may refer to various places in China:

Dunhuang, Gansu, historically known as Shazhou
Zhangjiagang, Jiangsu, formerly Shazhou County